The Food Stamp Act  (P.L. 88-525) provided permanent legislative authority to the Food Stamp Program, which had been administratively implemented on a pilot basis in 1962. On August 31, 1964 it was signed into law by President Lyndon B. Johnson. It was later replaced and completely rewritten and revised by the food stamp provisions of the Food and Agriculture Act of 1977 (P.L. 95-113, Title XIII; 7 U.S.C. 2011 et seq.), which eliminated the purchase requirement and simplified eligibility requirements.  Amendments were made to this Act in 1981–82, 1984–85, 1988, 1990, 1994, 1996, 1997, 1998 and 2002 (most recently by Title IV of the 2002 farm bill (P.L. 107-171, Sec. 4101-4126).

As of 2005, the current Food Stamp Act (7 U.S.C. 2011 et seq.) includes authority through FY2007 for the regular Food Stamp Program, for Nutrition Assistance Grants to Puerto Rico and American Samoa (in lieu of food stamps), for Food Distribution Program on Indian Reservations, and for commodity purchases for the Temporary Emergency Food Assistance Program.

Amendments

See also
 War on Poverty

References

External links

United States federal agriculture legislation
United States federal welfare and public assistance legislation
88th United States Congress
Supplemental Nutrition Assistance Program